Humphrey Osbaldston Brooke Firman VC (24 November 1886 – 24 April 1916) was an English recipient of the Victoria Cross, the highest and most prestigious award for gallantry in the face of the enemy that can be awarded to British and Commonwealth forces.

Firman was born at South Kensington in 1886 to Humphrey Brooke Firman, J.P. (of Gateforth, Selby, Yorkshire and New Malden, Surrey) and Florence Adelaide (née Cumming). He joined the Royal Navy as a cadet on 15 May 1901 and, as midshipman and sub-lieutenant, served on HMS Glory on the China Station, in the battleships HMS Albion and HMS Illustrious in the Channel Fleet, and in the Royal Yacht Victoria and Albert. Promoted to Lieutenant in 1908, he saw service in the Persian Gulf and off the Horn of Africa. During the First World War he was killed in action on the night of 24 April 1916 in Mesopotamia in an attempt to resupply the forces trapped in the Siege of Kut, at the age of 29. He was posthumously awarded the Victoria Cross for his deeds, as was a fellow naval officer, Lieutenant Commander Charles Cowley R.N.V.R.

Citation

In New Malden, Surrey, a plaque bearing his name was unveiled on the war memorial in April 2008, while Firman Close is named after him. A stone slab memorial to Firman is set into the pavement on the south side of South Kensington tube station and was unveiled on 25 April 2016. He is commemorated on the Basra Memorial.

His Victoria Cross is held at the York Castle Museum.

References

Monuments to Courage (David Harvey, 1999)
The Register of the Victoria Cross (This England, 1997)
VCs of the First World War: The Naval VCs (Stephen Snelling, 2002)

External links 
 

1886 births
1916 deaths
Royal Navy officers
British military personnel killed in World War I
British World War I recipients of the Victoria Cross
Royal Navy recipients of the Victoria Cross
People from Kensington
Royal Navy officers of World War I
People educated at Stubbington House School